Robert Schmidt (15 May 1864 – 16 September 1943) was a German trade unionist, journalist, politician and member of the Social Democratic Party of Germany. He served as the minister of Reichsernährungsminister (Alimentation), Reichswirtschaftsminister (Economic Affairs) and Reichsminister für Wiederaufbau (Reconstruction) in a number of cabinets of the Weimar Republic.

Life
Robert Schmidt was born in Berlin on 15 May 1864. He was apprenticed as a piano builder, and from 1890 to 1893 served as a member of the board of the association of piano builders of Berlin.

From 1893 to 1902, he was editor for the social-democratic newspaper Vorwärts.

From 1893 to 1898 and from 1903 to 1918, Schmidt was a member of the Reichstag of the German Empire for the Social Democratic Party of Germany. In 1902, he was a member of the Generalkommission of German trade unions and from 1903 to 1910 was head of the Zentral-Arbeitersekretariat.

In 1918, he became Unterstaatssekretär of the Kriegsernährungsamt. After the German Revolution, he was elected to the National Assembly of the Weimar Republic (1919–20). He remained a member of the Reichstag until 1930.

In 1919, Schmidt became  Reichsernährungsminister (Minister for Alimentation/Food) in the cabinet of Ministerpräsident Philipp Scheidemann. He continued to serve in the government as Reichswirtschaftsminister (minister for Economic Affairs) in the cabinet of Gustav Bauer (1919–20). He retained this position in the cabinets of Hermann Müller, and Joseph Wirth from March 1920 to November 1922, interrupted only by the Fehrenbach cabinet (June 1920 - May 1921), which excluded the SPD. In 1923, he was vice-chancellor and minister for Reconstruction in the first cabinet of Gustav Stresemann. In 1929, he again served briefly as minister for Reconstruction in the second cabinet of Hermann Müller.

Schmidt died on 16 September 1943 at Berlin.

References

External links
 

1864 births
1943 deaths
Politicians from Berlin
People from the Province of Brandenburg
Social Democratic Party of Germany politicians
Vice-Chancellors of Germany
Economy ministers of Germany
Government ministers of Germany
Members of the 9th Reichstag of the German Empire
Members of the 11th Reichstag of the German Empire
Members of the 12th Reichstag of the German Empire
Members of the 13th Reichstag of the German Empire
Members of the Weimar National Assembly
Members of the Reichstag of the Weimar Republic